Mohammad Mohsin (born 15 April 1996) is a Pakistani cricketer. He made his first-class debut for Peshawar in the 2015–16 Quaid-e-Azam Trophy on 2 November 2015. He made his List A debut for Peshawar in the 2018–19 Quaid-e-Azam One Day Cup on 8 October 2018. He made his Twenty20 debut for Peshawar in the 2018–19 National T20 Cup on 11 December 2018. In November 2019, he was named in Pakistan's squad for the 2019 ACC Emerging Teams Asia Cup in Bangladesh.

In December 2019, he was drafted by the Pakistan Super League (PSL) franchise Peshawar Zalmi in the Silver category during the 2020 PSL draft. He made his debut for the side against Karachi Kings in the 2020 Pakistan Super League.

In January 2021, he was named in Khyber Pakhtunkhwa's squad for the 2020–21 Pakistan Cup.

Early life
Born in Mingora, Khyber Pakhtunkhwa, and receiving his secondary education in Sargodha, Punjab, where his father was posted, he completed a Bachelor of Computer Science at the University of Engineering & Technology, Peshawar, and in sports has played basketball, badminton and table tennis while in cricket he takes former Indian international player Yuvraj Singh as role model for his all-rounder abilities.

References

External links
 

1996 births
Living people
Pakistani cricketers
People from Swat District
Peshawar cricketers
Peshawar Zalmi cricketers
University of Engineering & Technology, Peshawar alumni